The 1995–96 Football League Cup (known as the Coca-Cola Cup for sponsorship reasons) was the 36th Football League Cup, a knockout competition for England's top 92 football clubs.

The tournament was won by Aston Villa, who beat Leeds United 3–0 in the final at Wembley Stadium.

First round
56 of the First, Second and Third Division clubs compete from the First Round. Each section is divided equally into a pot of seeded clubs and a pot of unseeded clubs. Clubs' rankings depend upon their finishing position in the 1994–95 season.

First leg

Second leg

Second round

First leg

Second leg

Third round
Most matches in the third round were played on 24 and 25 October with 1 match being played on 7 November.

Ties

Replays

Fourth round
Most matches were played on 28-29 November with two replays being played on 20 December.

Ties

Replays

Quarter-finals
The four matches were played between 10 January with one replay being played on 24 January.

Ties

Replay

Semi-finals
The semi-final draw was made in January 1996 after the conclusion of the quarter finals. Unlike the other rounds, the semi-final ties were played over two legs, with each team playing one leg at home. The first leg matches were played on 11 and 14 February 1996, the second leg matches were played on 21 and 25 February 1996. Leeds United comfortably beat Birmingham City to reach their first domestic cup final for 23 years, while four-time winners Aston Villa only overcame Arsenal on away goals.

First leg

Second leg

Aston Villa win on away goals

Leeds United win 5–1 on aggregate

Final

The 1996 Coca-Cola Cup Final was played on 24 March 1996 and was contested between Aston Villa and Leeds United at Wembley Stadium. Aston Villa won the final 3–0 to equal Liverpool's record of five League Cup titles.

References

General

Specific

External links
Official Carling Cup website
Carling Cup at bbc.co.uk
League Cup news, match reports and pictures on Reuters.co.uk
Results on Soccerbase

1995-96
1995–96 domestic association football cups
Lea
Cup